Fundamental or Fundamental As Anything is the fifth studio album released by Australian rock/pop group, Mental As Anything. The album was produced by Richard Gottehrer and was released on Regular Records in March 1985. It peaked at #3 on the Australian Kent Music Report albums charts.

Recording 
The band had intended to use Gary Langan as producer as they admired his work with Art of Noise and were happy with the "wild" album he had planned. O'Doherty said, "He took on too much at the time and he got zonked out at all the stress and he pulled out something like five days before he was meant to be on the plane." The replacement was Richard Gottehrer, but they had to wait for a gap in his schedule, delaying the recording. O'Doherty said, "It’s too long because we’ve got four songwriters in the band and we ended up with over 30 songs demoed for Fundamental, more than enough for two albums."

Reception
Cash Box magazine said "Another strong album from this powerhouse Australian band. Variety is the key here, as the music runs the gamut from the gritty sensualism of "Hold On" to the depth and richness of "Date with Destiny"'."

Track listing

Personnel

Musicians
 Martin Plaza — lead vocals, guitar    
 Greedy Smith — lead vocals, keyboards, harmonica
 Reg Mombassa — guitar, vocals  
 Peter O'Doherty — bass, guitar, vocals 
 Wayne de Lisle – drums

Additional personnel
 Martin Armiger — guitar
 Mary Bradfield-Taylor — vocals
 Rick Chadwick — keyboards
 Sandi Chick — vocals 
 Andrew Farriss — keyboards 
 Mark Kennedy — percussion

Recording details
 Producer — Richard Gottehrer
 Engineer, mixing — Thom Panunzio
 Assistant — Allan Wright

Art work
 Art direction — Jana Hartig, Ken Smith, Sue Woollard
 Design — Martin Plaza, Greedy Smith (and cover design)
 Photography — Paula Clarke (cover photo), Paul Clarke, Hugh Hamilton, Frank Lindner (and sleeve photo), Francine McDougall

Charts

Weekly chart

Year-end chart

Certifications and sales

Release history

References

1985 albums
Mental As Anything albums
Albums produced by Richard Gottehrer
Regular Records albums
Festival Records albums
Epic Records albums
Warner Music Group albums
Columbia Records albums
Sony Records albums